The Committee on Ecumenical and Interreligious Affairs is the principal ecumenical and interfaith organization of the United States Conference of Catholic Bishops.

Active since the 1960s, it is firmly rooted in the teachings of the Second Vatican Council on dialogue between religions (Nostra Aetate) and dialogue between Christians (Unitatis Redintegratio).

Because the United States is one of the most religiously diverse countries in the world, it has also affected the global ecumenical and interfaith movement in collaborating with organizations that have members and leadership in other nations.

Ecumenical dialogue committees
American Baptist - Roman Catholic consultation
Joint Working Group with the National Council of Churches
Faith and Order Commission
Disciples of Christ - Roman Catholic dialogue
Methodist - Catholic dialogue
Lutheran-Roman Catholic dialogue
North American Orthodox-Catholic Theological Consultation
Anglican - Roman Catholic consultation
Oriental Orthodox - Roman Catholic consultation
Polish National Catholic - Roman Catholic dialogue

Interfaith dialogue partners
American Jewish Committee
American Jewish Congress
Synagogue Council of America
American Muslim Council
Islamic Society of North America
Islamic Circle of North America
Muslim American Society
Buddhist Sangha Council of Southern California
Ch’an/Zen Buddhism on the West Coast
Interfaith Relations Commission of the National Council of Churches

Chairmen
Lawrence Shehan (1964–1965)
John Carberry (1965–1969)
Charles Helmsing (1969–1972)
William Wakefield Baum (1972–1975)
Bernard Law (1975–1978)
Ernest L. Unterkoefler (1978–1981)
John F. Whealon (1981–1984)
William Keeler (1984–1987)
James Francis Stafford (1987–1990)
Rembert Weakland, O.S.B. (1990–1993)
Oscar H. Lipscomb (1993–1996)
Alexander J. Brunett (1996–1999)
Tod Brown (1999–2002)
Stephen Blaire (2002–2005)
Richard J. Sklba (2005–2008)
Wilton D. Gregory (2008–2011)
Denis J. Madden (2011–present)

References

Mandate of the Committee on the USCCB website — mandate from November 1968 and historical notes about the committee back to 1964

Religious organizations established in 1965
Catholic organizations established in the 20th century
Catholic ecumenical and interfaith relations
Interfaith organizations
Ecumenical and Interreligious Affairs